Peter Michael Ellis (born 25 September 1932) is an English former first-class cricketer.

Born at Ladywell, Ellis played second XI cricket for Middlesex from 1950–1953, but was unable to establish himself in the team. He did make a single appearance in first-class cricket for the Marylebone Cricket Club against Cambridge University at Fenner's in 1953. He was not called upon to bat during the match and with his right-arm medium-fast bowling he bowled 32 wicket-less overs. His son, Richard Ellis, also played first-class cricket.

References

External links

1932 births
Living people
People from Lewisham
English cricketers
Marylebone Cricket Club cricketers